The X-Files was a spin-off from the television series of the same name, originally published by Topps Comics and, most recently, DC Comics imprint Wildstorm.

Publication history

The first series was published by Topps Comics and ran for 41 issues from January 1995 to September 1998, coinciding with the second through fifth seasons of the television program.

In 1996, Topps published X-Files #0, an adaptation of the pilot episode, in order to test the market for a series adapting the episodes of the X-Files TV series. The issue was successful, and X-Files Season One ran for nine issues (August 1997 – July 1998). The series's name was provisional, and Topps in fact intended to adapt every episode, but never got as far as season two. The series was written by Roy Thomas, who would create a first draft for each issue by working off of the episode's script, then watch the actual episode and modify his work to account for changes made on the set.

Topps also published Ground Zero, a four-issue mini-series (December 1997 – March 1998).

Tony Isabella reported difficulties with The X-Files creator Chris Carter over the Topps Comics' series:

The digest consisted of three issues published at five month intervals beginning December 1995 through September 1996, each featuring separate titles: "Big Foot, Warm Heart", "Dead to the World", and "Scape Goats". All included stories from Ray Bradbury Comics.

There were also a number of one-offs like the Hero Illustrated Special (March 1995), and the graphic novel Afterflight (August 1997).

Wildstorm published The X-Files Special in August 2008. It was a one-shot timed with the release of the second film, written by Frank Spotnitz with art by Brian Denham. The deal Spotnitz signed was for another two comics. This became a six-part series that ran from November 2008 to April 2009 with Spotnitz writing the first two issues, Marv Wolfman for #3–4, and Doug Moench for #5–6. Wildstorm then teamed with IDW to publish The X-Files/30 Days of Night to positive reviews from July 2010. The six-issue limited series is written by 30 Days of Night creator Steve Niles and Tool guitarist Adam Jones and follows Mulder and Scully to Alaska to investigate a series of grisly murders that may be linked to vampires. IDW then went on in July 2013 to begin publishing The X-Files Season 10 as an ongoing series reuniting Mulder and Scully with creator Chris Carter returning as executive producer. This was followed by the eight-issue The X-Files Season 11 in 2015.

By the end of 2016, IDW Publishing has re-released all the previous Topps comics in collected form.

Creative contributors

Original series

Writers
Stefan Petrucha
Issues #1–16
Annual #1
Digests #1 and 2
Afterflight

John Rozum
Issues #17–19, 22–39, and 41
Annual #2
Digest #3

Kevin J. Anderson
Issues #20 and 21
Ground Zero
Dwight Jon Zimmerman
Issue #40

Artist
Charles Adlard
Issues #1–16, 18, 19, 22, 23, and 27–29
Annual #1
Digests #1–3

Pencillers
Gordon Purcell
Issues #17, 20, 21, and 24–29
Annual #2
Ground Zero

Alex Saviuk
Issues 30–41
Afterflight
Ground Zero

Inkers
Josef Rubenstein
Issues #17, 20, 21, and 24–29
Annual #2

Rick Magyar
Issues #30–41
Afterflight

Larry Mahlstedt
Ground Zero

Cover artists
Miran Kim
Issues #1–32 and 34–41
Annuals #1 and 2
Digests #1–3
Afterflight

George Pratt
Issue #33
Ground Zero

Plot

The three digests contained stories on Bigfoot, the Count of St. Germain and the Chupacabra, respectively.

Afterflight dealt with elements of the mystery airship flap.

Fight the Future was the official film adaptation, "Fight the Future" being the film's subtitle used to differentiate it from the television series.

Season One adapted some of the episodes from the first season: "Pilot", "Deep Throat", "Squeeze", "Conduit", "Ice", "Space", "Fire", "Beyond the Sea" and "Shadows". Two others, "The Jersey Devil" and "Ghost in the Machine", were solicited but never published.

Despite coinciding with the film, The X-Files Special will not be an adaptation but is set in what the writer calls "the classic period of the X-Files" – between Season 2 and Season 5. While this is a stand-alone story, he will be writing two more which fit into the broader conspiracy theory that developed, saying "the next ones that I am going to write tie into the mythology of the show not in a way that changes the path but deepens it a little bit."

Collected editions
The series has been collected into trade paperbacks. In the U.K., Titan Books did a near-complete run (which in the U.S. Topps Comics run stopped at #12) but recently Checker Book Publishing started publishing the rest (although they re-started the numbering again).

 The X-Files Collection (Topps Comics):
 Volume 1 (collects The X-Files #1–6 and The X-Files/Hero Illustrated Special, Berkley Publishing Group, February 1996)
 Volume 2 (collects The X-Files #7–12 and Annual #1, 180 pages, February 1997)
 Checker Book Publishing:
 Volume 1 (collects  #13–17, "Squeeze" and #0 "Pilot Episode", May 2005, Titan Books, July 2008)
 Volume 2 (collects #18–22, #1/2 and Digest #1, May 2005, Titan Books, July 2008)
 Volume 3 (collects #23–26, Fire, Ice and Hero Illustrated Special "Trick of the Light", December 2005)
 Titan Books:
 Firebird (by Stefan Petrucha, with art by Charlie Adlard, collects The X-Files #1–6 and The X-Files/Hero Illustrated Special "Trick of the Light", 160 pages, November 1995)
 Project Aquarius (by Stefan Petrucha, with art by Charlie Adlard, collects The X-Files #7–12, 151 pages, August 1996)
 The Haunting (by Stefan Petrucha, with art by Charlie Adlard, collects The X-Files #12–16, 160 pages, March 1997)
 Night Light (by Kevin J. Anderson and John Rozum, with art by Charlie Adlard and Gordon Purcell, collects The X-Files #17- 21, 128 pages, March 1997)
 Internal Affairs (by John Rozum, with art by Charlie Adlard, collects The X-Files #22–23, 128 pages, August 1997)
 Remote Control (by John Rozum, with art by Charlie Adlard, collects The X-Files #24–29, 160 pages, November 1997)
 Skin Deep (by John Rozum, with art by Alex Saviuk, collects The X-Files #30–33, 128 pages, April 1998)

Other volumes include:

Dead to the World (by Stefan Petrucha with Charlie Adlard, collects Digests #1–3, 208 pages, Titan Books, April 1996)
Afterflight (by Stefan Petrucha, with art by Jill Thompson, Alexander Saviuk and Rick Magyar, graphic novel, Topps, August 1997, Titan Books, October 1997)

The Wildstorm comics are also being collected:

The X-Files (176 pages, Wildstorm, November 2009)

Digital editions
The X-Files series is released digitally exclusively through Devil's Due Digital.

Reception
A review of the first Checker Book volume is complimentary about the writing and art, but scathing about the production values of the book itself, stating that "this collection from Checker reflects a lack of editorial control, poor workmanship, and generally shoddy values".

Notes

References

The X-Files Comics Checklist
Fantastic Fiction listing for The X-Files

External links 
 Digest 1, The X-Files #0, 0.5, 1-28 at Wowio
 Interview with Stefan Petrucha
 X-Files digital comics from Devil's Due Digital.

1995 comics debuts
1998 comics endings
Comics based on television series
Comics based on films
Comics by Don McGregor
Comics by Marv Wolfman
Comics